The ice hockey team rosters at the 1988 Winter Olympics consisted of the following players:

Austria
Thomas Cijan, Konrad Dorn, Kelly Greenbank, Kurt Harand, Bernard Hutz, Werner Kerth, Gert Kompajn, Rudolf König, Günter Koren, Ed Lebler, Robert Mack, Manfred Mühr, Martin Platzer, Herbert Pöck, Gerhard Pusnik, Peter Raffl, Robin Sadler, Andreas Salat, Michael Shea, Brian Stankiewicz, Hans Sulzer, Silvio Szybisti, Peter Znenahlik

Canada
Ken Berry, Serge Boisvert, Brian Bradley, Sean Burke, Chris Felix, Marc Habscheid, Randy Gregg, Bob Joyce, Vaughn Karpan, Merlin Malinowski, Andy Moog, Jim Peplinski, Serge Roy, Wally Schreiber, Gord Sherven, Tony Stiles, Steve Tambellini, Claude Vilgrain, Tim Watters, Ken Yaremchuk, Trent Yawney, Zarley Zalapski

Czechoslovakia
Jaroslav Benák, Mojmír Božík, Petr Bříza, Jiří Doležal, Oto Haščák, Dominik Hašek, Miloslav Hořava, Jiří Hrdina, Jiří Lála, Igor Liba, Dušan Pašek, Radim Raděvič, Petr Rosol, Vladimír Růžička, Bedřich Ščerban, Jiří Šejba, Jaromír Šindel, Antonín Stavjaňa, Rudolf Suchánek, Eduard Uvíra, Rostislav Vlach, Petr Vlk, David Volek

Finland
Timo Blomqvist, Kari Eloranta, Raimo Helminen, Iiro Järvi, Esa Keskinen, Erkki Laine, Kari Laitinen, Erkki Lehtonen, Jyrki Lumme, Reijo Mikkolainen, Jarmo Myllys, Teppo Numminen, Janne Ojanen, Arto Ruotanen, Reijo Ruotsalainen, Simo Saarinen,  Kai Suikkanen, Timo Susi, Jukka Tammi, Jari Torkki, Pekka Tuomisto, Jukka Virtanen

France
Peter Almásy, Paulin Bordeleau, Stéphane Botteri, Philippe Bozon, Jean-Marc Djian, Guy Dupuis, Patrick Foliot, Derek Haas, Michel Leblanc, Jean-Philippe Lemoine, Jean-Christophe Lerondeau, Stéphane Lessard, Daniel Maric, Franck Pajonkowski, André Peloffy, Christian Pouget, Antoine Richer, Pierre Schmitt, Christophe Ville, Steven Woodburn

Norway
Cato Tom Andersen, Morgan Andersen, Lars Bergseng, Arne Billkvam, Tor Helge Eikeland, Åge Ellingsen, Jarl Eriksen, Stephen Foyn, Jarle Friis, Rune Gulliksen, Geir Hoff, Roy Johansen, Erik Kristiansen, Truls Kristiansen, Ørjan Løvdal, Vern Mott, Jørgen Salsten, Petter Salsten, Tommy Skaarberg, Kim Søgaard, Sigurd Thinn, Petter Thoresen, Marius Voigt

Poland
Janusz Adamiec, Marek Cholewa, Jerzy Christ, Mirosław Copija, Henryk Gruth, Andrzej Hanisz, Leszek Jachna, Andrzej Kądziołka, Franciszek Kukla, Piotr Kwasigroch, Jarosław Morawiecki, Ireneusz Pacula, Krzysztof Podsiadło, Jerzy Potz, Gabriel Samolej, Krystian Sikorski, Roman Steblecki, Marek Stebnicki, Jan Stopczyk, Andrzej Świątek, Jacek Szopiński, Robert Szopiński

Soviet Union
Ilya Byakin, Vyacheslav Bykov, Aleksandr Chernykh, Viacheslav Fetisov, Alexei Gusarov, Valeri Kamensky, Alexei Kasatonov, Andrei Khomutov, Vladimir Krutov, Igor Larionov, Aleksandr Kozhevnikov, Igor Kravchuk, Andrei Lomakin, Sergei Makarov, Alexander Mogilny, Sergei Mylnikov, Vitali Samoilov, Anatoly Semenov, Sergei Starikov, Igor Stelnov, Sergei Svetlov, Sergei Yashin

Sweden
Mikael Andersson, Peter Andersson, Peter Åslin, Bo Berglund, Jonas Bergqvist, Thom Eklund, Anders Eldebrink, Peter Eriksson, Thomas Eriksson, Michael Hjälm, Lars Ivarsson, Mikael Johansson, Lars Karlsson, Mats Kihlström, Peter Lindmark, Lars Molin, Lars-Gunnar Pettersson, Thomas Rundqvist, Tommy Samuelsson, Ulf Sandström, Håkan Södergren, Jens Öhling

Anders Bergman was also part of the Swedish roster but did not play.

Switzerland
Olivier Anken, Gaetan Boucher, Patrice Brasey, Richard Bucher, Urs Burkart, Manuele Celio, Pietro Cunti, Jörg Eberle, Felix Hollenstein, Peter Jaks, André Künzi, Jakob Kölliker, Marc Leuenberger, Alfred Lüthi, Fausto Mazzoleni, Gil Montandon, Philipp Neuenschwander, Andreas Ritsch, Bruno Rogger, Peter Schlagenhauf, Thomas Vrabec, Roman Wäger

United States
John Blue, Allen Bourbeau, Greg Brown, Clark Donatelli, Scott Fusco, Guy Gosselin, Tony Granato, Craig Janney, Jim Johannson, Peter Laviolette, Steve Leach, Brian Leetch, Lane MacDonald, Corey Millen, Kevin Miller, Jeff Norton, Todd Okerlund, Mike Richter, Dave Snuggerud, Kevin Stevens, Chris Terreri, Eric Weinrich, Scott Young

West Germany
Christian Brittig, Helmut de Raaf, Peter Draisaitl, Ron Fischer, Georg Franz, Karl Friesen, Dieter Hegen, Georg Holzmann, Udo Kießling, Harold Kreis, Horst-Peter Kretschmer, Dieter Medicus, Andreas Niederberger, Peter Obresa, Joachim Reil, Roy Roedger, Josef Schlickenrieder, Manfred Schuster, Helmut Steiger, Bernd Truntschka, Gerd Truntschka, Manfred Wolf, Peter Schiller

References

Sources

Hockey Hall Of Fame page on the 1988 Olympics

rosters
1988